The 1972 Houston Astros season was a season in American baseball. The team finished second in the National League West with a record of 84–69, 10½ games behind the Cincinnati Reds and just a percentage point ahead of the Los Angeles Dodgers. The 1972 season was the first winning season in Astros history.

Offseason 
 November 29, 1971: Joe Morgan, Ed Armbrister, Jack Billingham, César Gerónimo, and Denis Menke were traded by the Astros to the Cincinnati Reds for Lee May, Tommy Helms, and Jimmy Stewart.
 December 2, 1971: John Mayberry and Dave Grangaard (minors) were traded by the Astros to the Kansas City Royals for Jim York and Lance Clemons.

Regular season

Season standings

Record vs. opponents

Notable transactions 
June 6, 1972: Jim Crawford was selected by the Astros in the 14th round of the 1972 Major League Baseball draft.

Roster

Player stats

Batting

Starters by position 
Note: Pos = Position; G = Games played; AB = At bats; H = Hits; Avg. = Batting average; HR = Home runs; RBI = Runs batted in

Other batters 
Note: G = Games played; AB = At bats; H = Hits; Avg. = Batting average; HR = Home runs; RBI = Runs batted in

Pitching

Starting pitchers 
Note: G = Games pitched; IP = Innings pitched; W = Wins; L = Losses; ERA = Earned run average; SO = Strikeouts

Other pitchers 
Note: G = Games pitched; IP = Innings pitched; W = Wins; L = Losses; ERA = Earned run average; SO = Strikeouts

Relief pitchers 
Note: G = Games pitched; W = Wins; L = Losses; SV = Saves; ERA = Earned run average; SO = Strikeouts

Farm system

References

External links
1972 Houston Astros season at Baseball Reference

Houston Astros seasons
Houston Astros season
Houston Astro